Eduardo Risso (born 23 November 1959) is an Argentine comics artist. In the United States he is best known for his work with writer Brian Azzarello on the Vertigo title 100 Bullets, while in Argentina and Europe he is noted for his collaborations with Ricardo Barreiro and Carlos Trillo. He has received much acclaim for his work.

He is the main creator of the popular Argentine comic convention Crack Bang Boom; a massive event which is held annually in the city of Rosario and is considered as the most important of its type in South America.

Biography
Risso was born in Leones in Córdoba Province, Argentina, and started as a cartoonist in 1981, drawing his first collaborations for the morning newspaper La Nación and the magazines Eroticón and Satiricón, all published by Editorial Columba. In 1986, he worked for Eura Editoriale of Rome, Italy, and in 1987 he drew Parque Chas, scripted by Ricardo Barreiro. The series was first published by Fierro in Argentina and then by Totem in Spain,  Comic Art in Italy and finally the complete series as an album in France, Germany, Denmark, Belgium, the Netherlands, Poland and the United States. In 1988, he drew Cain, again scripted by Barreiro.

Later that same year, Risso drew Fulù, scripted by Carlos Trillo, published in Italy, France, Germany, Portugal, the Netherlands, and in Argentina in the Puertitas magazine. The Trillo-Risso duo also created Simon: An American Tale, published in Italy and France, Borderline, published in Italy and Chicanos, published in Italy and France.

Risso and writer Brian Azzarello launched the 100 Bullets series for Vertigo in August 1999. Azzarello and Risso collaborated on several Batman stories as well including "Broken City" in Batman #620–625 (December 2003 – May 2004); a Batman serial for Wednesday Comics #1–12 (2009); and the Flashpoint: Batman Knight of Vengeance limited series in 2011. Other projects from the team include Spaceman and the 100 Bullets: Brother Lono limited series. Risso and writer J. Michael Straczynski produced the Before Watchmen: Moloch two-issue limited series in 2013. Paul Dini's Dark Night: A True Batman Story graphic novel was drawn by Risso in 2016. He also started work on the Image Comics series Moonshine.

In 2010 he created the Argentine event Crack Bang Boom, a comics/Argentine comics, cartoon, cosplay, fantasy and science-fiction convention, which is annually held in the city of Rosario. Hosted and organized by Risso with a group of collaborators and with support from the Municipality of Rosario, Crack Bang Boom has become the most famous convention of its type in Argentina, as well as one of the most important events for the comics world in South America.

Awards
Risso has won four Eisner Awards for his work on 100 Bullets with Brian Azzarello. He won for the "Best Serialized Story" in 2001; for "Best Continuing Series" in 2002 and 2004; and for "Best Artist" in 2002. He won the Harvey Award for "Best Artist" in 2002 and 2003.

Bibliography

1980s (Argentine years) 1987 – Parque Chas (written by Ricardo Barreiro, serialized in Heavy Metal as Park Charles, 1997–2001)
 1988 – Cain (written by Ricardo Barreiro, U.S. edition 2003 Strip Art Features)
 1989 – Fulù (written by Carlos Trillo)

1990s (European years)
 1992 – Simon, Una Aventura Americana (written by Carlos Trillo)
 1994 – Video Nocturno (written by Carlos Trillo, U.S. edition 2001 Dark Horse/SAF "Vidéo Noire")
 1995 – Boy Vampiro (written by Carlos Trillo, U.S. edition 2003–2004 Strip Art Features Boy Vampire)
 1996 – Borderline (written by Carlos Trillo, U.S. edition 2005 announced by Dynamite Entertainment)
 1996 – Horror Revisitado (written by Carlos Trillo, serialized in Heavy Metal)
 1997 – Chicanos (written by Carlos Trillo, U.S. edition 2005–2006 IDW Publishing eight issues)

1997 (U.S. debut) 1997/07 – Aliens Wraith, Dark Horse Comics
 1997/09 and 11 – Alien: Resurrection, Dark Horse Comics
 1997/09 – "Slippery Woman" (in Heavy Metal)
 1998 – Los Misterios de la Luna Roja, (U.S. edition 2005–2006, Strip Art Features, four volumes)
 1998/03 – "Indecision" (in Heavy Metal)
 1998/05 – "Incompatibility" (in Heavy Metal)
 1998/09-12 – Jonny Double (four issue miniseries), DC Comics
 1998/11 – "Costume Party" (in Heavy Metal)

1999 (100 Bullets begins )
 1999 – 100 Bullets (issues #1–5), DC Comics
 1999/03 – "The Death of a Romantic" (in Heartthrobs #3), DC Comics
 1999/08 – "Food Chain" (in Flinch #2), DC Comics

2000
 2000 – 100 Bullets (issues #6–17), DC Comics
 2000/01 – 100 Bullets Vol. 1: First Shot, Last Call, DC Comics
 2000/01 – Vertigo: Winter's Edge #3: "Silencer Night", DC Comics
 2000/03 – Transmetropolitan #31, DC Comics
 2000/04 – Transmetropolitan: I Hate it Here #1, DC Comics
 2000/05 – "Spring Fever" (in Heavy Metal)
 2000/08 – "Batman: Scars" (Batman Black and White back-up story in Batman: Gotham Knights #8), DC Comics

2001
 2001 – 100 Bullets (issues #18–29), DC Comics
 2001/02 – 100 Bullets Vol. 2: Split Second Chance, DC Comics
 2001/03 – "The Swamp Monster Strikes Again" (in Heavy Metal)
 2001/04 – "Once Upon a Time in the Future" (in Weird Western Tales #3), DC Comics
 2001/07 – Spider-Man's Tangled Web #4: "Severance Package", Marvel Comics
 2001/11 – 100 Bullets Vol.3: Hang Up on the Hang Low, DC Comics

2002
 2002 – 100 Bullets (issues #30–39), DC Comics
 2002/01- "911: America's Pastime" (in 9-11: The World's Finest Comic Book Writers & Artists Tell Stories to Remember, Volume Two)
 2002/01- Superman pinup (in The Adventures of Superman #600), DC Comics
 2002/05 – Alan Moore – Monographie
 2002/06 – 100 Bullets Vol. 4: A Foregone Tomorrow, DC Comics
 2002/07 – Green Lantern pinup (in Green Lantern Secret Files and Origins #3), DC Comics

2003
 2003 – 100 Bullets (issues #40–47), DC Comics
 2003 – Bernet (pinup in Art Book)
 2003/03 – 100 Bullets Vol. 5: The Counterfifth Detective, DC Comics
 2003/04 – Vertigo X Preview (pinup), DC Comics
 2003/09 – 100 Bullets Vol. 6: Six Feet Under the Gun, DC Comics
 2003/10 – 2004/03 – Batman #620–625 (2003–2004), collected in Batman: Broken City, DC Comics
 2003/10 – JSA All-Stars #6 
(Doctor Mid-Nite story), DC Comics

2004
 2005 – 100 Bullets (#48–54), DC Comics
 2004/03 – Wonder Woman vol. 2 #200 (pinup), DC Comics
 2004/07 – 100 Bullets Vol. 7: Samurai, DC Comics
 2004/09 – Eduardo Risso: Black. White

2005
 2005 – 100 Bullets (#55–65), DC Comics
 2005/02 – Batman Black and White statue, DC Comics
 2005/04 –  Vertigo: First Taste
 2005/07 – 100 Bullets Vol. 8: The Hard Way, DC Comics

2006
 2006 – 100 Bullets (issues #66–77), DC Comics
 2006/04 – 100 Bullets Vol. 9: Strychnine Lives, DC Comics

2007
 2007 – 100 Bullets (issues #78–85), DC Comics

2008
 2008 – 100 Bullets (issues #86–96), DC Comics
 2008 – Logan #1–3, Marvel Comics
 2008 – The Spirit #13, DC Comics

2009
 2008 – 100 Bullets (issues #97–100), DC Comics
 2009 – Wednesday Comics #1–12 (Batman serial), DC Comics

2010
 2010 – DMZ #50 (pinup), DC Comics
 2010 – Vampire Boy, Dark Horse Comics

2011
 2011 – Jonah Hex #62, DC Comics
 2011 – Strange Adventures vol. 4 #1, DC Comics 
 2011 – Flashpoint: Batman Knight of Vengeance #1–3, DC Comics 
 2011 – Spaceman #1, DC Comics

2012
 2012 – Spaceman #2–9, DC Comics

2013
 2013 – Before Watchmen: Moloch #1–2, DC Comics
 2013 – 100 Bullets: Brother Lono #1–5, DC Comics

2014
 2014 – 100 Bullets: Brother Lono #6–8, DC Comics

2016
 2016 – Dark Night: A True Batman Story, DC Comics
 2016 – Moonshine #1–3, Image Comics
 2016 – The Dark Knight III: The Master Race #2 (Wonder Woman story), DC Comics

2022
 2022 – Flashpoint Beyond #0, DC Comics

Covers only
Red Sonja #5 (Dynamite Entertainment, 2006)
Superman #700 (DC Comics, 2010)
First Wave #5 (DC Comics, 2011)
Before Watchmen: Comedian #1 (DC Comics, 2012)

References

External links

 Official Site
 Risso publications in Vecu bdoubliees.com
 Eduardo Risso at Mike's Amazing World of Comics
 Eduardo Risso at the Unofficial Handbook of Marvel Comics Creators

1959 births
20th-century Argentine male artists
21st-century Argentine male artists
Argentine comics artists
DC Comics people
Eisner Award winners for Best Penciller/Inker or Penciller/Inker Team
Harvey Award winners for Best Artist or Penciller
Living people
Marvel Comics people
People from Córdoba Province, Argentina
Inkpot Award winners